e&, doing business as etisalat by e& is an Emirati-based multinational telecommunications services provider, currently operating in 16 countries across Asia, the Middle East and Africa. It is the 18th largest mobile network operator in the world by number of subscribers. In December 2020, etisalat claimed to provide the world’s fastest 5G download speed at 9.1 Gigabits per second, a network which it has started rolling out in Dubai since 2017. etisalat is the strongest brand in the Middle East and Africa, and the 4th strongest telecoms brand in the world.

On 31 December 2021, etisalat reported consolidated revenue of AED53.3 billion and net profits of AED11.1 billion. The total market capitalization of the company currently is AED329 billion.

etisalat is one of the Internet hubs in the Middle East (AS8966), providing connectivity to other telecommunications operators in the region. It is also the largest carrier of international voice traffic in the Middle East and Africa and the 12th largest voice carrier in the world. As of October 2008, etisalat has 510 roaming agreements covering 186 countries and enabling BlackBerry, 3G, GPRS and voice roaming. etisalat operates Points of Presence (PoP) in New York, London, Amsterdam, Frankfurt, Paris and Singapore. In December 2011 etisalat announced the commercial launch of etisalat 4G LTE Network. In May 2018 etisalat announced the commercial launch of etisalat 5G LTE Network, becoming the first telecom operator in the Middle East and North Africa (MENA) region to do so.

On 24 February, 2022, etisalat Group launched a new brand identity called e&. The group also announced that it will keep the previous branding identity in the UAE and internationally.

History

etisalat was founded in 1976 as a joint-stock company between International Aeradio Limited, a British Company, and local partners. In 1983, the ownership structure changed – United Arab Emirates government held a 60% share in the company and the remaining 40% were publicly traded.

In 1991, the UAE central government issued Federal Law No. 1, which gave the corporation the right to provide the telecommunications wired and wireless services in the country and between UAE and other countries. It also gave the firm the right to issue licenses for owning, importing, manufacturing, using or operating telecommunication equipment. This practically gave etisalat both regulatory and control powers, which completed the monopoly of the telecom giant in the UAE. In order to safeguard the country's economic development, the law made provisions for the development of the telecommunication sector in the country.

The increase of exchange lines from 36,000 in 1976 to more than 737,000 in 1998 was one of the important indicators of etisalat network's growth and development. Today etisalat stands 140th among the Financial Times Top 500 Corporations in the world in terms of market capitalisation, and is ranked by The Middle East magazine as the 6th largest company in the Middle East in terms of capitalization and revenues. The Corporation is the largest contributor outside the oil sector to development programmes of the UAE Federal Government. etisalat has also won accolades from across the region for its nationalization programme. In November 2013, it was also announced that etisalat would be the official sponsor of Cyprus First Division side Anorthosis Famagusta.

e&

e& is headquartered in Abu Dhabi and includes three regional offices – Abu Dhabi, Dubai, and Northern Emirates. The Northern Emirates regional center is based in Sharjah and covers the telecom's operations in the emirates of Ajman, Umm Al Quwain, Fujairah and Ras Al Khaimah.
 
In the UAE, e& operates where mobile penetration is already among the highest in the world "200%", etisalat became known for its efforts to roll out its Fibre-To-The-Home (FTTH) network in the UAE. By the end of 2009, etisalat had completed the FTTH roll-out for 85% of households in Abu Dhabi, positioning the UAE's capital as the first in the world to be covered by fibre.

Some of the Internet services for home users that etisalat offers include:
3G Mobile Internet access
4G Mobile Internet access
Broadband Internet services (Al Shamil and eLife)
Prepaid and post-paid dialup Internet access
Cloud gaming services in partnership with Gamestream

e& also operates iZone, a system of Wi-Fi hotspots in central locations, such as shopping malls, restaurants, and sheesha cafes. iZone can be accessed by either purchasing prepaid cards, or if using an existing account. Dial-up and ISDN Internet access services are billed by the hour, whereas the domestic and residential cable and DSL connections have a fixed monthly rate depending on speed. Other Internet links, aimed at business users, have traffic utilization plans and relatively high rates when exceeding the allocated bandwidth quota. This has caused bad publicity for etisalat and is a major source of criticism. 

In addition to its telecommunication service provider and carrier units, e& incorporates a number of additional non-telecom business units under the umbrella of etisalat Services Holding LLC. These units support the company's operations and even provide services to other operators and organizations in the UAE, namely: training and consultancy services (etisalat Academy), SIM/smart card manufacturing and payment solutions (Ebtikar), data clearing house services (EDCH), peering/voice and data transit (Emirates Internet Exchange – EMIX), call center (The Contact Centre), cable TV (eVision), facilities management (EFM), as well as submarine cable laying services (eMarine).

etisalat is a major investor in Thuraya (34.5%), a satellite geo-mobile communication systems provider. In 2006 etisalat started a major restructuring program that resulted in the de-merger of many of its non-core business units operating under the telecom's centralized and direct management; core services were consolidated and streamlined, reflecting the company's shift from a technology-driven telecom to a customer-focused services provider. As part of the program, etisalat launched a re-branding campaign, releasing a new corporate logo and identity in May 2006. The restructuring culminated in the incorporation of etisalat Services Holding LLC, which as of 2008 oversees the operation of etisalat's non-telecom business units with huge success stories. On 27 March 2016 Saleh Al Abdooli has been appointed the Group CEO, extending his responsibility to international operations. Al Abdooli resigned from the organization due to personal reasons in May 2020 and Hatem Dowidar was appointed as the interim Group CEO who was later confirmed as the Group CEO on 16 December 2020.

On 1 June 2013, etisalat introduced free local and national HD calls across the UAE. Later that week, corporate, private, public and government sectors in the country were provided with better business IT solutions when etisalat launched its first cloud service in the UAE.

International presence

etisalat International Investments was the business unit of etisalat that operated telecom operations outside the UAE and managed the corporation's stakes in telecommunications carriers in Afghanistan, Egypt, Niger, Saudi Arabia, Sri Lanka and Pakistan. The International Investments unit, and its management team, was re-structured into etisalat Group, and Ahmad Abdulkarim Julfar was appointed as Group CEO in 2011, followed by Saleh Al Abdooli in 2016.

As of July 2021, etisalat has presence and operations in 15 countries outside the United Arab Emirates.

Mobily – Saudi Arabia

One of etisalat's first international investments was the bid to become the second mobile services operator in Saudi Arabia. Mobily, the brand name of Etihad etisalat founded in 2005 is currently the second largest mobile service provider in Saudi Arabia with over 20 million subscribers. In less than 6 months the company launched services in 32 cities, Mobily brings coverage to 79.2 percent of the population. Mobily was also the first to build in the shortest period the fastest 3G network in the Kingdom.

Maroc Telecom – Morocco

In July 2013, Vivendi announced it would sell its 53% stake in Maroc Telecom to etisalat for around $5.7 billion. Maroc Telecom joined etisalat Group in 2014 offering telecom and ICT products and services including fixed line, mobile, internet and television. The telecom company is the first global telecom operator in Morocco.

PTCL – Pakistan

Pakistan Telecommunication Company Ltd (ptcl) is the country's largest and most reliable multi-service telecom carrier. etisalat acquired PTCL in 2005 with 26 percent shares including management control from the Government of Pakistan as part of a large privatization initiative. PTCL leads the country in broadband subscriptions, with over 1.3 million in 200 cities while enjoying a robust fiber-optic network which provides access in over 550 locations across the country.

etisalat Misr

In July 2006, a consortium led by etisalat was granted the rights to develop Egypt's third mobile network, with a winning bid of £E16.7 billion (EUR €2.29 billion). The venture, etisalat Misr, competes with existing service providers Vodafone and Orange. On 12 September 2006, it was announced that the network would be built by Ericsson of Sweden, and Huawei of China, at a cost of approximately US$1.2 billion.

etisalat Egypt's network covers and serves over 99% of the population in Egypt, through more than 6000 base stations, etisalat Egypt was the first to launch 3.75G in Egypt and the first operator to launch video call services in Egypt.

Etisalat Afghanistan

etisalat Afghanistan was launched in 2007 after the UAE telecom operator won the license to operate as the fourth mobile services provider in the Islamic Republic of Afghanistan.

The operator rapidly became the fastest-growing telecommunications service provider of the country. etisalat Afghanistan has invested over US$300 million in the Afghan telecom industry, and it is a wholly owned by etisalat Group. In 2012, etisalat won 3G license in Afghanistan and launched the first 3G services in history of Afghanistan.

etisalat shares 60 to 70 mobile towers with government-owned Afghan Telecom, which seeks to grow its five percent market share.

Mauritel – Mauritania

Mauritel is the leading telecommunications company in Mauritania. Mauritel maintains a market share stabilized at around 60% of the population.

Mauritanian Telecommunications Company (Mauritel) Mauritel, which is 41.2% indirectly owned by Maroc Telecom of Morocco, has reportedly renewed its mobile licence in the African country for a further ten years.

Sotelma – Mali

The former incumbent telco Sotelma (branded Malitel) was sold by the Government and ended up in the hands of Maroc Telecom. With the sale of Maroc Telecom, its ownership passed onto etisalat.

Sotelma provides local and international fixed line telephony, internet, mobile telephone and other telecom services. Its mobile service subsidiary is Malitel, with more than 6 million customers.

Moov – West Africa

In Africa, etisalat acquired 50% of Atlantique Telecom's shares in April 2005. Based in the Ivory Coast, AT owns mobile operators in Benin, Burkina Faso, Togo, Niger, Central African Republic, Gabon and Côte d'Ivoire. In 2007, etisalat increased its shares in AT to 70% and again in May 2008, to 82%.

etisalat Group's brand MOOV operates throughout West Africa, in Benin, Togo, Gabon, Niger, Central Africa, Burkina Faso (as ONATEL) and Côte d'Ivoire, Serving over 50 million people. MOOV covers on average 60% of the populated areas in each of its countries of operations.

Former presence

Canar – Sudan

etisalat is one of the founding partner companies of Canar Telecom, a fixed-line telecom services operator. In September 2007 etisalat has raised its stake in Canar from 37% to 82% at an estimated cost of AED 584.17 million (US$159 million).

Canar was launched on 27 November 2005. The operator is reported to use NGN and Wireless Local Loop (WLL) technologies for its voice, data, internet and multimedia services. Canar is one of the first operators in Africa to use an NGN network core. In 2016, etisalat made an exit from the Sudanese market by selling its 92.3% share to the Bank of Khartoum for AED349.6 million.

etisalat Nigeria
etisalat Nigeria launched one of the first major broadband services in the country – EasyBlaze. The company is known for its innovative products and services such as the Eco Sim and the first network to offer special numbers to Nigerians as their mobile numbers via the 0809uchoose campaign.

From 2012 to 2015, etisalat Nigeria hosted the etisalat Prize for Innovation, established to promote African Internet expansion.

In April 2013, etisalat Nigeria announced it would invest $500 million to expand its network, enabling further potential market growth of 17%. In June 2013, it launched the etisalat Prize for Literature the first pan-African prize for debut published writers.

In October 2016, etisalat Nigeria announced 4G LTE with a frequency band 3 (1800 MHz). Speed test results indicate 28Mbit/s download and 11Mbit/s upload. This LTE network currently covers some part of Lagos and Abuja.

In March 2017, Nigeria telecoms regulator pushed for talks to halt takeover attempts by etisalat creditors and reschedule its outstanding $1.2 bln loan. In July 2017, etisalat withdrew from the market after its debt was not repaid or rescheduled. The local operator has renamed itself 9mobile.

9mobile, is a Nigerian private limited liability company. EMTS acquired a Unified Access Service License from the Nigerian Communications Commission in 2007. The License enables EMTS provide Fixed Telephony (wired or wireless), Digital Mobile Services, International Gateway Services and National/Regional Long Distance Services in addition to spectrum assignments in the 900 and 1800 MHz bands. The Current Managing Director and Chief Executive Officer of 9mobile is Mr Bode Olusanya.

etisalat Sri Lanka

etisalat acquired the Sri Lankan Operation of Millicom International Cellular (MIC), Tigo (Sri Lanka) on 16 October 2009. The acquisition was completed with a total enterprise value of $207 million, out of which $155 million was in cash.

Tigo (Sri Lanka) under the brand name CELLTEL started operations in June 1989 on a Motorola TACS system and was the first cellular operator in Sri Lanka as well as South Asia. In January 2007, Millicom replaced the local CELLTEL brand with Tigo, their international brand. In February 2010, Tigo was rebranded as etisalat.

etisalat Lanka operates a GSM/EDGE supported network using 900 / 1800 MHz. The company on 5 May 2011 launched HSPA+ services over 2100 MHz, becoming the first LTE ready mobile network in the country. Dual Carrier HSPA+ services was launched on 15 August 2012 by etisalat Sri Lanka, the first operator in South Asia to do so.

etisalat Lanka was recently mentioned in the UNCTAD Information Economy Report of 2012 for the Android Eco System it had been able to develop in Sri Lanka. It was commended for its inclusive policy and several other innovations done in the market such as the AppZone (Sri Lanka's first independent 3rd party app store and the Book Hub, Sri Lanka's first eBook store) Many governments are now looking at this eco system and how it can too be implemented in their respective countries.

In April 2018 CK Hutchison Holdings and etisalat Group have entered into a definitive agreement to merge their mobile telecommunications businesses in Sri Lanka. Upon completion of the transaction, CKHH Group will have the majority and controlling stake in the combined entity. CK Hutchison completed the acquisition of etisalat Lanka on 30 November 2018.

Controversies

Internet censorship
etisalat operates an Internet content filtering system that blocks access to web resources. The web resources are claimed to be controversial or offensive (i.e. sexually explicit content, certain political and religious websites, anonymizers and proxies) or harmful (i.e. numeric IP addresses, known phishing or malicious websites, botnet command servers). The use of content filtering is mandated by the Telecommunications and Digital Government Regulatory Authority of the United Arab Emirates.

There are claims that etisalat breaks the rules of net neutrality by throttling peer-to-peer, gaming and other types of network traffic in order to reduce the load on its oversubscribed international links. The effect of this interference is most noticeable during weekends or periods of high network use. The overall efficiency of the country-wide content filtering is unclear, as many residents have discovered tools and methods to bypass the content filter, such as using Tor.

The type of content that is restricted by etisalat includes:
 Pornography, nudity and sexually explicit content
 Certain media-sharing websites
 Anti-Islamic websites
 Websites criticizing the United Arab Emirates (such as UAEprison and Arab Times (United States))
 Anonymous proxy sites (such as vtunnel, pzeg, etc.)
 Gay and Lesbian Rights websites (such as Gaydar, Mogenic etc.)
 Numerical IP address links (for example, http://10.11.1.1/)
 Voice over IP services providers' websites (such as Vonage)

VoIP ban
The United Arab Emirates blocks many popular voice over IP services like Skype. The only licensed VoIP service is BOTIM, which is operated by etisalat and charges monthly fees.

BlackBerry controversy

In July 2009, etisalat pushed an update to BlackBerry devices operating on the telecom's national network, citing performance improvements. However, it was later discovered that the update contained eavesdropping software, developed by the US-based software development company SS8, which specializes in electronic surveillance. It is reported that the software enabled the company to monitor and forward communications on BlackBerry devices to their servers. Research in Motion, BlackBerry's developer, acknowledged that the patch was a form of spyware, and issued a removal patch on 20 July.

On 27 December 2009, both etisalat and du have been mandated by the UAE telecom regulator to start filtering BlackBerry users' web access and block illegal content. Due to concerns with the security and the provisioning of legal interception for Blackberry non-voice services, on 1 August 2010, the Telecommunication Regularity Authority of the UAE instructed etisalat that all Blackberry e-mail, internet and messenger functions must be suspended on 1 October 2010. However, an agreement between Blackberry's developer Research in Motion and UAE's telecom regulator has been reached, and the announced BlackBerry services suspension has been canceled.

etisalat Iran

In January 2009 etisalat in consortium with Tamin Telecom (a subsidiary of the Iranian Social Security Organization (SSO)) won the bid for running the third mobile services operator in the Islamic Republic of Iran. The license included an exclusive two-year agreement for 3G services provisioning, but in Sep 2009 the licence was revoked and given to its local partner,Tamin Telecom.

etisalat had planned to invest over $5 billion (AED 18.39 billion) over a period of five years, but following the license suspension all plans for launching operation in Iran have been put on hold.

etisalat India

In 2009 etisalat has announced that its Indian unit, erstwhile Swan Telecom (owned by Dynamix Balwas Realty and Reliance Communications), headquartered in Mumbai, is renamed to etisalat DB Telecom India Pvt. Ltd. The business unit has been awarded Unified Services Access License in 15 telecom circles (Andhra Pradesh, Delhi, Gujarat, Haryana, Karnataka, Kerala, Maharashtra, Mumbai, Punjab, Rajasthan, Tamil Nadu (including Chennai), Uttar Pradesh (East), Uttar Pradesh (West), Madhya Pradesh and Bihar). Brand name was "Cheers Mobile".

In April 2010 etisalat began signal testing in Chennai [IND 922], Delhi & NCR [IND 913], Maharashtra & Goa [IND 919], Mumbai [IND 916] and Gujarat [IND 914]. In May 2010, etisalat was in talks to buy 25% stake in Reliance Communications, but the deal was not finalised.

In 2010, following the $39 billion 2G spectrum case, etisalat DB, the Indian subsidiary of the company, was stopped from buying a stake in a Chennai-based company due to objections raised by the Ministry of Home Affairs (MHA). etisalat DB was not allowed to buy back the 5.27 per cent stake held by Chennai-based Genex Exim Ventures since the home ministry raised objections based largely on security concerns. The MHA had pointed out four issues that needed to be resolved before allowing the company to come into etisalat DB, a company that got scarce 2G spectrum at allegedly throwaway prices.

It raised objections about etisalat's presence in Pakistan and its connection with Pakistan's intelligence agency ISI. etisalat owns a 26% stake in Pakistan Telecommunications and has a subscriber base of 3 million in Afghanistan. The MHA has also expressed concerns about the telecom surveillance software etisalat had used in a Blackberry service it had introduced in the UAE and recommended that the company should not be allowed to offer Blackberry services in India.

On 22 February 2012, etisalat announced that it will cease operations in India post cancellation of its licenses by Supreme Court of India. It issued notice to its subscribers, giving them 30 days to change operator. On 5 September 2012, etisalat announced that it would not bid for spectrum in the November 2012 2G spectrum auction. In a released statement the company said, "etisalat Group has decided not to participate in the auction as it is not willing to re-participate after being canceled its owned licences. Following the publication by Department of Telecomm (DoT) – India’s Ministry of Communications and Information Technology of the information memorandum for the planned auction of spectrum in 1800 MHz and 800 MHz bands, the Emirates Telecommunications Corporation (etisalat) wishes to confirm that it has decided not to participate in the auction".

See also
Emirates Integrated Telecommunications Company (du)
Communications in the United Arab Emirates
Etisalat Prize for Literature
Etisalat Award for Arabic Children's Literature

References

External links

 
Internet service providers of the United Arab Emirates
Mobile phone companies of the United Arab Emirates
Companies based in Abu Dhabi
Technology companies established in 1976
Companies listed on the Abu Dhabi Securities Exchange
Multinational companies headquartered in the United Arab Emirates
Emirati brands
Emirati companies established in 1976
Telecommunications in Nigeria